Erythrolamprus oligolepis is a species of snake in the family Colubridae. The species is found in Brazil, Venezuela, and Peru.

References

Erythrolamprus
Reptiles of Brazil
Reptiles of Venezuela
Reptiles of Peru
Reptiles described in 1905
Taxa named by George Albert Boulenger